Slaves is a 1969 American drama film directed by Herbert Biberman. The film stars Dionne Warwick (in her screen acting debut), Ossie Davis, and Stephen Boyd.

Plot
Set in the 1850s South, the film follows Cassy and Luke, two black slaves who are sold to the sadistic plantation owner MacKay. He wants labor from the men and sex from the women. On this, he is determined to exploit both Cassy and Luke.

Cast
 Dionne Warwick as Cassy
 Ossie Davis as Luke
 Stephen Boyd as MacKay
 Marilyn Clark as Mrs. Bennett
 Nancy Coleman as Mrs. Stillwell
 Julius Harris as Shadrach
 James Heath as Luther
 David Huddleston as Holland
 Eva Jessye as Julie
 Oscar Paul Jones as Zacharious
 Aldine King as Emmeline
 Robert Kya-Hill as Jericho
 Gale Sondergaard as New Orleans Lady
 Shepperd Strudwick as Mr. Stillwell
 Barbara Ann Teer as Esther

Release
The film opened at the Hippodrome Theatre in Baltimore on May 6, 1969. It was also entered into the 1969 Cannes Film Festival.

Reception
It received negative reviews, but was one of Continental Distributing's highest-grossing films. Lou Cedrone of the Baltimore Evening Sun, believed that "'Slaves,' [...] is a strong film, one likely to inflame and maybe even enlighten. But it is also a very badly done film, and that's a pity because slavery, as it 'really was' in this country, is a story that should be told, but with much more finesse than is evident here". Cedrone added that the film "at times looks as though it might have been made during the silent era, so backward are the cutting, direction and framing."

Clifford Terry of the Chicago Tribune dubbed the film "a kind of 'Uncle Tom's Cabin Revisted'", opening his review by calling it "a horrendous box-office exploitation of a horrendous historical exploitation" and remarking that "everyone involved with the creation of this pitiful production deserves, at the minimum, a good, sound whupping." His successor, Gene Siskel, named the film as one of the worst to be released in 1969.

Bruce Vilanch of the Detroit Free Press called the film "a cheap, poorly-executed, thinly-veiled plea for black militancy", noting that "in Hollywood's former days it would have been called a 'heavy meller,' or melodrama gone sour, but in 1969 it is just a shade above sheer exploitation." He added:  Vilanch did, however, praise the performances of Davis and Warwick, the latter of whom was deemed "a very stylized singer who shows that her talents may not be confined to Burt Bacharach's arrangements."

Kathleen Carroll's review of the film in the New York Daily News contained simply five paragraphs:

in The New York Times, Vincent Canby described the film as "a kind of cinematic carpetbagging project in which some contemporary movie-makers have raided the antebellum South and attempted to impose on it their own attitudes that will explain 1969 black militancy. The result, which opened here yesterday at the DeMille and neighborhood theaters, is a pre-fab 'Uncle Tom's Cabin,' set in an 1850 Mississippi where everybody—masters and slaves alike—talks as if he had been weaned, at best, on the Group Theater, and, at worst, on silent-movie titles." He added:

See also
 List of American films of 1969
List of films featuring slavery

References

External links

1969 films
1969 drama films
American drama films
Films directed by Herbert Biberman
Films about American slavery
Films set in the 1850s
1960s English-language films
1960s American films